Iacob Alexandru Holz (born 1902, date of death unknown) was a Romanian football striker. Iacon Holz played one game at international level for Romania in a 1924 friendly which ended with a 4–1 loss against Austria. He was also part of Romania's 1924 Summer Olympics squad.

References

External links
 

1902 births
Year of death missing
Romanian footballers
Romania international footballers
Footballers at the 1924 Summer Olympics
CA Timișoara players
Place of birth missing
Association football forwards